Mohammed Jaber may refer to:

 Muhammad Jaber Al Safa (1875–1945), historian, writer and politician
 Mohammed Jaber (footballer) (born 1989), Emirati footballer